Timothy E. Ginter (born May 25, 1955) is an American politician serving as the Speaker Pro Tempore of the Ohio House of Representatives. He has served in the House of Representatives since 2015, representing District 5. Ginter is an ordained minister, and has also worked in various other occupations. He ran against Jason Wilson in 2008 for the Ohio Senate, but lost. In 2014, Ginter replaced Craig Newbold as the Republican candidate for state representative in the 5th district. Ginter went on to defeat incumbent Democrat Nick Barborak in the 2014 general election with 59% of the vote. He is a member of the Ohio Farm Bureau, National Rifle Association, Buckeye Firearms Association, Salem Chamber of Commerce, an associate member of the Columbiana County Township Association, a member of the Columbiana County Republican Party Central Committee, and currently serves as an appointed member of the Ohio Commission on Fatherhood.

In 2019, Ginter co-sponsored legislation that would ban abortion in Ohio and criminalize what they called "abortion murder". Doctors who performed abortions in cases of ectopic pregnancy and other life-threatening conditions would be exempt from prosecution only if they "[took] all possible steps to preserve the life of the unborn child, while preserving the life of the woman. Such steps include, if applicable, attempting to reimplant an ectopic pregnancy into the woman's uterus". Reimplantation of an ectopic pregnancy is not a recognized or medically feasible procedure.

References

External links
 Ohio State Representative Timothy E. Ginter official site
 Official campaign site

1955 births
21st-century American politicians
American Christian clergy
Living people
Mount Vernon Nazarene University alumni
People from Salem, Ohio
People from Shelby, Ohio
Republican Party members of the Ohio House of Representatives